The 1977 Indian general election was held to constitute the 6th Lok Sabha. Polling was held between 16 and 20 March 1977. It was held during the Emergency period, which ceased on 21 March 1977, right before the final results were announced.

The election resulted in a heavy defeat for the Indian National Congress (INC) government, with the incumbent Prime Minister and INC party leader Indira Gandhi losing her Lok Sabha seat from Rae Bareli. The call for the restoration of democracy by revoking the Emergency is considered to be a major reason for the sweeping victory for the opposition Janata alliance, whose leader Morarji Desai was sworn in as the fourth Prime Minister of India on 24 March 1977.

In Gujarat, Janata Party/ BLD won 16 seats while INC won 10 seats out of a total of 26 seats. The number of seats increased to 26 from 24 from the previous election.

Party-wise results summary

Results- Constituency wise

References

Indian general elections in Gujarat
Gujarat
1970s in Gujarat